Radhe Radhe: Rites of Holi is a studio album by American jazz musician Vijay Iyer. It was released on  under ECM Records as a soundtrack for Prashant Bhargava's experimental documentary film Radhe Radhe. The album was commissioned by Emil Kang, Executive Director of the Carolina Performing Arts as part of a wider series of works to celebrate the centenary of Igor Stravinsky's The Rite of Spring (1913).

Reception
Ian Patterson of All About Jazz stated "With a lesser orchestrator and technician than Iyer it would have been easy to succumb entirely to Bhargava's seductive visual poetry, with the music relegated to second plane. Iyer, however, is finely attuned to the dramaturgy unfolding and his highly empathetic score traces the arc between the myriad manifestations of the festival's early morning preparations and the unfolding maelstrom of mass euphoria that follows. To the initial frames of nature—so still they seem to be photographs—the dual pianos of Iyer and Cory Smythe impose contrasting tension—a harbinger of the drama to come."

Jason Ferguson of Orlando Weekly wrote "Much like Stravinsky’s Rite, Iyer and Bhargava’s Rites is a work that’s steeped in dissonance and dashed expectations. As the day unfolds and societal strictures are loosened, the music and filmwork intensifies, immersing the viewer in the dizzying, suppressive chaos of celebrations that gradually turn threatening, especially to the women taking part; meanwhile, the coupling of Radha and Krishna follows a similarly pulse-raising path, with Radha’s sly smile turning ominous and imposing."

Track listing

Part II: Transcendence

Personnel
Adam Sliwinski – conductor
Vijay Iyer – piano (left channel), electronics
Cory Smythe – piano (right channel)
Amir Elsaffar – trumpet
Jennifer Curtis – violin
Gareth Flowers – trumpet
Rebekah Heller – bassoon
Laura Cocks – flute
Joshua Rubin – clarinet
Kyle Armbrust – viola 
Kivie Cahn-Lipman – cello
Eric Lamb – flute
Tyshawn Sorey – percussion
Ross Karre – percussion

References

2014 albums
Vijay Iyer albums
ECM Records albums
Albums produced by Manfred Eicher
Jazz albums by American artists